Darko Belojević (Serbian Cyrillic: Дарко Белојевић; born 14 December 1960) is a Serbian former professional footballer who played as a goalkeeper.

During his playing career, Belojević represented Sloboda Užice, Olimpija Ljubljana, and Partizan in the former Yugoslavia, as well as Adanaspor in Turkey.

After retiring from the game, Belojević served as goalkeeping coach at the FR Yugoslavia national team, Partizan, and Shandong Luneng.

Honours
Partizan
 Yugoslav First League: 1985–86, 1986–87
 Yugoslav Cup: 1988–89

References

External links
 Darko Belojević at Znanje.org
 

Adanaspor footballers
Association football goalkeepers
Association football goalkeeping coaches
Expatriate footballers in Turkey
FK Partizan non-playing staff
FK Partizan players
FK Sloboda Užice players
NK Olimpija Ljubljana (1945–2005) players
People from Požega, Serbia
Serbian expatriate sportspeople in China
Serbian footballers
Süper Lig players
Yugoslav expatriate footballers
Yugoslav expatriate sportspeople in Turkey
Yugoslav First League players
Yugoslav footballers
1960 births
Living people